Maciej Joczysz (born 11 March 1992) is a Polish former football defender. He have played for Polonia Warsaw in Ekstraklasa.

References

External links 
 

1992 births
Living people
Polish footballers
Polonia Warsaw players
KTS Weszło Warsaw players
Footballers from Warsaw
Association football forwards